Serena Mary Rothschild, Baroness Rothschild (née Dunn; 28 April 1935 – 13 January 2019) was a British Thoroughbred racehorse owner and the wife of Jacob Rothschild, 4th Baron Rothschild.

Early life
Rothschild was the daughter of Sir Philip Gordon Dunn, Bt., and Lady Mary Sybil St. Clair-Erskine (daughter of James St Clair-Erskine, 5th Earl of Rosslyn). Her sister is the writer Nell Dunn. Her paternal grandfather was Sir James Dunn, Bt., a prominent Canadian financier.

Thoroughbred racing
Rothschild oversaw the management of Waddesdon Stud at Waddesdon Manor in Buckinghamshire. In November 2006, she paid 3 million guineas for the mare Spinning Queen, then a world record price (for a filly or broodmare) of 4.6 million guineas when she purchased Magical Romance at the Tattersalls sale.

In 2009, her colt Pounced, trained by John Gosden and ridden by Frankie Dettori, won the Breeders' Cup Juvenile Turf at Santa Anita Park in Arcadia, California. In 2011, her colt Nathaniel won the King Edward VII Stakes (G2) at Ascot and the King George VI and Queen Elizabeth Stakes (G1), also at Ascot.  In 2012, she won the Eclipse Stakes (G1) with Nathaniel, The Lancashire Oaks (G2), and then the Irish Oaks (Classic G1) with Great Heavens.

Personal life
On 20 October 1961, she married financier Jacob Rothschild, with whom she had four children, Hannah (b. 1962),  Beth (b. 1964), Emily (b. 1967), and Nathaniel (b. 1971).

The couple made their home at Pewsey, Wiltshire, and maintained a villa on the Greek island of Corfu. She and her husband were involved in a number of charitable and humanitarian organisations, and she was a Vice President of the Wiltshire Blind Association.

Lady Rothschild died in a London hospital on 13 January 2019 following a short illness.  She was 83.

References

1935 births
2019 deaths
British racehorse owners and breeders
British baronesses
Serena Dunn Rothschild
Daughters of baronets